The DStv Mzansi Viewers' Choice Awards is a South African award show presented by DStv. The awards honour the year's biggest achievements in television, radio, music, sports, and comedy, voted by viewers living in South Africa.

Award ceremonies (by year)

In both 2017 and 2018, the venue for the event was at Sandton Convention Centre, Johannesburg
{| class="wikitable" style="font-size:95%; width:100%
|-
!Year
!Date
!Host(s)
!Performers
|-
| style="text-align:center;"|2017
| style="text-align:center;|26 August 2017
| rowspan="2" | Bonang Matheba
|
Lady Zamar, Prince Kaybee and Zodwa Wabantu
AKA and Anatii
Thandiswa Mazwai
Lebo Sekgobela
Tshedi Mholo and Cassper Nyovest
Hugh Masekela
DJ Cleo, Winnie Khumalo and Busiswa
|-
| style="text-align:center;|2018
| style="text-align:center;|24 November 2018
|
Team Mosha, Sandy, Sun-El Musician and Simmy
Bucie, Nokwazi and Sho Madjozi
Mlindo The Vocalist, Sjava and Saudi
Khaya Mthethwa, Ntokozo Mbambo and Dumi Mkokstad
Rebecca Malope
Kwesta
Mafikizolo
DJ Maphorisa, Moonchild Sanelly, DJ Raybe and Zulu Mkhatini
|-
| style="text-align:center;|2020
| style="text-align:center;|14 March 2020
| Minnie Dlamini 
| 
|-
| colspan="4" 
|-
| 2022
| 25 June 2022
| Lawrence Maleka

Award Categories

Current Categories

Favourite Personality Of The Year
Favourite Song Of The Year
Favourite TV Presenter
Favourite Comedian
Favourite Rising Star
Favourite Radio Personality 
Favourite Actor
Favourite Actress
Favourite Music Artist/Group
Favourite DJ
Favourite Sports Personality
Ultimate Viewers' Choice

Special Categories

1Life Life Changer Award
Lifetime Achievement Award

References 

2010s South African television series
Audience awards
South African television awards
South African music awards